Punkrockacademyfightsong is the third album by the punk rock band Down by Law, released in 1994. It contains a cover of the Proclaimers' hit song "I'm Gonna Be (500 Miles)". Singer Dave Smalley considered it the band's best known album.

Production
The album was produced by Michael Douglass. It was recorded at A&M Studios, in Hollywood, California. Down by Law was in the studio at the same time as the Rolling Stones; the Stones allegedly complained about the volume of the band's punk rock.

Critical reception

The Chicago Reader labeled the album "punk as pabulum," and considered the band an "alternative-rock Raffi." The Las Vegas Review-Journal deemed it "19 terse, incisive tunes that epitomize the California sound." The Boston Herald opined: "Fast and loud, yet marvelously melodic, Down By Law takes punk to a new level and proves it can be more than just angry noise."

AllMusic called the album "a solid, polished album of raw punk rock."

Track listing
  "Punk Won"  (Phillips, Smalley) – 2:57
  "Hit Or Miss"  (Smalley) – 3:22
  "Flower Tattoo"  (Oswald) – 1:20
  "Sympathy For The World"  (Oswald) – 3:15
  "I'm Gonna Be (500 Miles)"  (Reid) – 4:04
  "Brief Tommy"  – 0:05
  "Bright Green Globe"  (Smalley) – 3:37
  "Minusame"  (Oswald, Williams) – 2:25
  "Drummin' Dave, Hunter Up"  (Oswald) – 0:30
  "Punk As Fuck"  (Smalley) – 1:34
  "1944"  (Smalley) – 3:56
  "The King & I"  (Oswald) – 2:16
  "Haircut"  (Smalley) – 2:21
  "Chocolate Jerk"  (Oswald) – 1:51
  "Sam I"  (Oswald) – 1:08
  "Heroes & Hooligans"  (Oswald, Smalley) – 3:29
  "Soldier Boy"  (Smalley) – 3:59
  "Goodnight Song"  (Smalley) – 3:51
  "Sam II"  (Oswald) – 0:27

Personnel
 Dave Smalley - Vocals, Guitar
 Hunter Oswald - Drums, Vocals
 "Angry" John Di Mambro - Bass
 Sam Williams III - Lead Guitar

References

Down by Law (band) albums
1994 albums
Epitaph Records albums